Astrology has used the concept of classical elements from antiquity up until the present. In Western astrology and Sidereal astrology four elements are used: Fire, Earth, Air, and Water.

Western astrology

In Western tropical astrology, there are 12 astrological signs. Each of the four elements is associated with three signs of the Zodiac, which are always located exactly 120 degrees away from each other along the ecliptic and said to be in trine with one another. Most modern astrologers use the four classical elements extensively, (also known as triplicities), and indeed it is still viewed as a critical part of interpreting the astrological chart.

Beginning with the first sign Aries which is a Fire sign, the next in line Taurus is Earth, then to Gemini which is Air, and finally to Cancer which is Water. This cycle continues on twice more and ends with the twelfth and final astrological sign, Pisces. The elemental rulerships for the twelve astrological signs of the zodiac (according to Marcus Manilius) are summarised as follows:

 Fire — 1 – Aries; 5 – Leo; 9 – Sagittarius – hot, dry, ardent
 Earth — 2 – Taurus; 6 – Virgo; 10 – Capricorn – heavy, cold, dry
 Air — 3 – Gemini; 7 – Libra; 11 – Aquarius – light, hot, wet
 Water — 4 – Cancer; 8 – Scorpio; 12 – Pisces – cold, wet, soft

Elements of the zodiac

Triplicity rulerships 
In traditional astrology, each triplicity has several planetary rulers, which change with conditions of sect – that is, whether the chart is a day chart or a night chart.  Triplicity rulerships are an important essential dignity – one of the several factors used by traditional astrologers to weigh strength, effectiveness, and integrity of each planet in a chart.

Triplicity rulerships (using the "Dorothean system") are as follows:

"Participating" rulers were not used by Ptolemy, as well as some subsequent astrologers in later traditions who followed his approach.

Triplicities by season 
In ancient astrology, triplicities were more of a seasonal nature, so a season was given the qualities of an element, which means the signs associated with that season would be allocated to that element.  The seasonal elements of ancient astrology are as follows:

 Spring (wet becoming hot) – Air – Gemini, Libra, Aquarius
 Summer (hot becoming dry) – Fire – Aries, Leo, Sagittarius
 Autumn (dry becoming cold) – Earth – Taurus, Virgo, Capricorn 
 Winter (cold becoming wet) – Water – Cancer, Scorpio, Pisces
 
Using the seasonal qualities accounts for the differences in expression between signs of the same element. All the fire signs are by their nature hot and dry. However, the addition of the elemental qualities of the seasons results in differences between the fire signs. Aries being a Spring sign is wet (hot & dry, hot & wet), Leo being the midsummer sign gets a double dose of hot and dry and is the pure fire sign, and Sagittarius being an Autumnal sign is colder (hot & dry, cold & dry).

In the Southern Hemisphere the seasonal cycle is reversed.

This yields secondary and tertiary elements for each sign.

These associations are not given any great importance in modern astrology, although they are prominent in modern Western ceremonial magic, reconstructionist neopagan systems such as neodruidism and Wicca.

Vedic astrology

Sidereal (Vedic) astrology shares the same system as Western astrology of linking zodiac signs to elements.

In addition, in Vedic thought each of the five planets are linked to an element (with space as the fifth).  It was said in the Veda that everything emanated from the one basic vibration of "Om" or "Aum". From "Om" the five elemental vibrations emerged representing the five different tattwas (or elements). The five planets represent these five vibrations  – Jupiter for Space, Saturn for Air, Mars for Fire,
Mercury for Earth, and Venus for Water.

Chinese astrology

In many traditional Chinese theory fields, matter and its developmental movement stage can be classified into the Wu Xing. They are Wood ruler Jupiter, Green, East and Spring, Fire ruler Mars, Red, South and Summer, Earth ruler Saturn, Yellow, Center and Last Summer, Metal ruler Venus, White, West and Autumn and Water ruler Mercury, Black, North and Winter. That said, the essence of the Wu Xing is really about the notion of five stages, rather than about five types of material.

Explanatory notes 
 Ptolemy later modified the rulerships of Water triplicity, making Mars the ruler of the water triplicity for both day and night charts – and William Lilly concurred.

References

Astrological signs

Classical elements
Esoteric cosmology
History of astrology
Technical factors of astrology